Abrazo Arrowhead Campus is an acute care hospital located in Glendale, Arizona, United States.

Named after founder Cornelius Alphonse Abrazo, of which little is known, the hospital opened in 1988.  In 1999, Phoenix Baptist and Arrowhead Hospitals were acquired by Vanguard Health Systems. In 2003, Vanguard established Abrazo Health Care as its Arizona subsidiary. Abrazo is the second largest health care delivery system in Arizona, United States. Abrazo Health Care is located in Phoenix, Arizona. In 2013, Vanguard was acquired by Tenet Healthcare.

Services
 Diagnostic and interventional cardiovascular care
 Open-heart surgery
 Orthopedic services
 Obstetrics
 Inpatient and outpatient surgery
 Women’s health care
 24-hour emergency care.

Abrazo Peoria Emergency Center
Abrazo Peoria Emergency Center is a 14-bed emergency center located in Peoria, Arizona. The Emergency Center is operated and staffed by Arrowhead Hospital. The facility offers CT scans, ultrasound and other diagnostic imaging services, and an on-site laboratory.

Accreditations
 Received Hospital Value Index Award for best in value, quality, efficiency, affordability, satisfaction, best in region, best in state, best in market
 Designated a UnitedHealth Premium Total Joint Replacement Program
 Arrowhead Hospital and West Valley Hospital received the Blue Distinction Center for Knee and Hip Replacement by BlueCross BlueShield Association
 Recognized as U.S. News & World Report Best Hospital in Phoenix, recognized for Ear, Nose and Throat care specialty
 3 star rating by the Society of Thoracic Surgeons (STS), the highest award given by the STS
 Accredited Chest Pain Center with PCI by The Society of Chest Pain Centers
 Beacon Award winner for Critical Care Excellence by the American Association of Critical-Care Nurses
 Best Acute Care Hospital Award by Total Benchmark Solution
 Accredited by The Joint Commission JCAHO
 Primary Stroke Center designated by the American Stroke Association
 Top 100 Hospital by Thomson Reuters®

References

Tenet Healthcare
Hospitals in Arizona
Hospitals established in 1988
Buildings and structures in Glendale, Arizona